KQRO-LD (channel 45) is a low-powered television station licensed to Morgan Hill, California, United States, serving the San Francisco Bay Area as an affiliate of BeIN Sports Xtra. Its transmitter is located atop Loma Prieta peak in the Santa Cruz Mountains west of Morgan Hill. It is owned by HC2 Holdings.

History 
The station’s construction permit was issued in 2014 under the calls of K02QX-D. The current callsign of KQRO-LD was adapted on January 28, 2016.  It was owned by One Ministries, and sold to HC2 in 2017.

In 2022, KQRO-LD switch its affiliation to BeIN Sports Xtra.

Subchannels
The station's digital signal is multiplexed:

References

External links

Innovate Corp.
Low-power television stations in the United States
QRO-LD
Television channels and stations established in 2014
2014 establishments in California